Owl Moon is a 1987 children's picture book written by Jane Yolen and illustrated by John Schoenherr. It won many awards, most notably the Caldecott Medal for its illustrations, and has appeared on Reading Rainbow in the US. It has been translated into more than a dozen foreign languages, including French, German, Chinese, and Korean. In 1989, Weston Woods Studios adapted the book to an animated film narrated by Yolen.

Yolen described the book as "a positive family story. It's about a girl and her father. Usually stories of a little girl are with her mother. It is gentle yet adventurous, quiet yet full of sound".

Plot
The story deals with a father who takes his child owling for the first time on a cold winter night. Along their way, they encounter a great horned owl. While the first-person text does not specify the child's gender, the jacket flap copy refers to the characters as "a little girl and her father". According to Jane Yolen's website, she is actually Yolen's child, Heidi. The "Pa" character is based on her husband, David, who was an avid outdoorsman and birdwatcher. "I've become aware of nature through my husband", said Yolen.

References

External links
 Yolen's Website for the book
 

1987 children's books
American picture books
Caldecott Medal–winning works
Children's books by Jane Yolen
Children's fiction books
Fictional owls
Philomel Books books